Joseph Wells may refer to:

 Joseph C. Wells (1814–1860), American architect
 Joseph Wells (cricketer) (1828–1910), English cricketer, father of author H. G. Wells
 Robert Joseph Wells (1856–1941), Minnesota politician
 Joseph Wells (academic) (1855–1929), British author and Oxford academic
 Joseph Algernon Wells (1885–1946), British track and field athlete
 Joey Wells (born 1965), long jumper from the Bahamas
 Joseph T. Wells, former American fraud examiner, founder of the Association of Certified Fraud Examiners
 Joseph Wells (politician) Lieutenant Governor of Illinois (1846-1849)
 Joseph Morrill Wells (1853–1890), American architect

See also
 Joseph's Well, identified with the pit in Galilee into which the Biblical figure Joseph was cast by his brothers
 Josephs Well, a music venue in Leeds, England